Richard Zahn Hartwig Voss (10 November 1880 – 3 September 1948) was an English first-class cricketer.

Voss was born at Dunham, Cheshire. He later attended Lincoln College, Oxford. While at Oxford he played first-class cricket for Oxford University, making his debut against the Marylebone Cricket Club at Oxford in 1901. Voss played first-class cricket for Oxford University from 1901 to 1903, making seven appearances. He scored 264 runs for Oxford University at an average of 20.30, with a high score of 50. He also made a first-class appearance for London County against Lancashire in 1903. He later played minor counties cricket for Cheshire from 1909–1914, making nine appearances in the Minor Counties Championship.

After graduating from Oxford, Voss became a lawyer. He died at Flixton in September 1948.

References

External links

1880 births
1948 deaths
People from Altrincham
Alumni of Lincoln College, Oxford
English cricketers
Oxford University cricketers
London County cricketers
Cheshire cricketers
20th-century English lawyers